Oleynikovo is a rural locality (a settlement) in Promyslovsky Selsoviet, Limansky District, Astrakhan Oblast, Russia. The population was 26 as of 2010. There is 1 street.

Geography 
Oleynikovo is located 28 km southwest of Liman (the district's administrative centre) by road. Yandyki is the nearest rural locality.

References 

Rural localities in Limansky District